Austro Engine is an Austrian manufacturer of aircraft engines based at Wiener Neustadt in Lower Austria.

History
The production site and headquarters was built in 2007 with an investment of EUR 13 Million. The company was founded by Diamond Aircraft Industries and partners. The products are reciprocating engines and Wankel engines.  The Wankel aero-engines are developed from the MidWest AE series engines developed at Staverton by MidWest, a UK firm that was bought by Diamond.

Products

Austro Engine E4 (AE 300)

Reciprocating four-cylinder, four-stroke diesel aircraft engine, marketed as the AE 300, it produces 170 hp (127 kW). Certified through the European Aviation Safety Agency EASA on January 28, 2009 and through the FAA on July 29, 2009. The E4 is installed on various types of Diamond Aircraft Industries aircraft.

Austro Engine AE 330
Derived from the AE300, the AE 330 produces an increased 180hp (132kW) of power.  Two AE330s are used to power the  Diamond DA62.

AE50R

The AE50R is installed on the Schleicher ASH 30, Schleicher ASH 31 and Schiebel Camcopter S-100.

AE75R

Further development of the AE50R. No certification. Twin rotor, (max)  at 7000 rpm, .

AE80R

AE200
3-cylinder inline, . Intended to power a diesel variant of the Diamond DA20.

AE500

Based on Steyr Motors' M1 3.2 liter "Monoblock", the AE500 (6-cylinder) is the result of the cooperation between the two companies. It was intended for use in the Diamond DA50 but was instead replaced with the Continental CD-300.

Austro Engine GIAE110R

Does not seem to have been placed in production.

See also

References

External links

 Official Austro Engine website
 Diamond Aircraft North America
 Austro filling the gap for Diamond (flightglobal.com)

Aircraft engine manufacturers of Austria
Economy of Lower Austria
Wiener Neustadt